The 1993 European Weightlifting Championships were held in Sofia, Bulgaria from April 20 to April 25, 1993. It was the 72nd edition of the men's event. There were a total number of 153 athletes competing, from 27 nations. The women competition were held in Valencia, Spain. It was the 6th event for the women.

Medal overview

Men

Medals tables 
Ranking by "Big" (Total result) medals

References
Weightlifting Database

European Weightlifting Championships
European Weightlifting Championships
European Weightlifting Championships
International weightlifting competitions hosted by Bulgaria
Sports competitions in Sofia